Joe McGrath was an Irish Gaelic football and hurling coach, known for his All-Ireland success with Cork and for "revolutionising" training programs. He led Blackrock towards All-Ireland glory in 1973 and later led Cork to the All-Ireland U21 hurling success. He was also responsible for the McGrath Cup. He died in 2013 following a long illness, and was buried at St James Cemetery in Chetwynd; his funeral was attended by figures from the Gaelic Athletic Association and politics, including former GAA President Mick Loftus, broadcaster Mícheál Ó Muircheartaigh and then TD Micheál Martin.

References

Year of birth missing
2013 deaths
Gaelic football managers
Hurling managers